Eveready East Africa is a Kenyan manufacturer and marketer of battery brands. It is headquartered in Nairobi, while maintaining a plant in Nakuru, Kenya.

Overview 
Eveready East Africa is an affiliate of the American Eveready Battery Company. In addition to manufacturing and marketing batteries, Eveready East Africa also distributes a wide range of products such as shaving razors, blades and accessories under brand names Schick and Clorox household products. Eveready East Africa is one of Africa's largest battery manufacturers, and is listed on the Nairobi Securities Exchange.

History 
Eveready East Africa was founded on 6 March 1967 as Union Carbide Kenya Limited, a subsidiary of US based Union Carbide Corporation. In the same year, ICDC and ICDC Investments (now Centum Investments) joined in as minority shareholders.

The firm's name was changed to Eveready Batteries Kenya Limited on 24 October 1986. Sameer Group acquired a majority stake in the company in 1988 through its wholly owned subsidiary East Africa Batteries.

2004 saw the company diversify into other consumer products, under the Schick brand, following the acquisition of Schick-Wilkinson Sword by Energizer Holdings. In the same year, the company name was changed to its current name of Eveready East Africa.

The shares of Eveready East Africa were listed on the Nairobi Securities Exchange in 2006 through an initial public offering, which was over subscribed by 733%.

Member companies 
Other than battery manufacturing, Eveready East Africa has invested in real estate through its wholly owned subsidiary, Flamingo Properties. Flamingo Properties is based in Kenya, and in turn has a subsidiary, Flamingo Properties Uganda Limited, which is domiciled in Kampala, Uganda.

Shareholding 
The stock of Eveready East Africa is listed on the NSE, where it trades under the symbol EVRD. , the ten largest shareholders in the Group's stock are depicted in the table below:

References

External links
 Eveready East Africa official site
 Google finance, Eveready East Africa Limited

Consumer battery manufacturers
Electronics companies established in 1967
Manufacturing companies based in Nairobi
Companies listed on the Nairobi Securities Exchange
Kenyan companies established in 1967
Energizer Holdings